China Communications is a monthly peer-reviewed academic journal covering all aspects of information and communications technology. The editor-in-chief is Jianhua Lu (Tsinghua University).

Abstracting and indexing
The journal is abstracted and indexed by the following databases:
Inspec
Science Citation Index Expanded
Scopus
According to the Journal Citation Reports, the journal has a 2020 impact factor of 2.688.

References

External links

Monthly journals
Communication journals
English-language journals
Publications established in 2004